Mount Julian is a peak located at the southern end of Maligne Lake in Jasper National Park, Alberta, Canada.

The mountain was named in 1928 by Leo Amery for his son Julian

The mountain was first climbed in 1930 by J.A. Corry, C.G. Crawford, E.M. Gillespie, J. McAuley, M. Percy, R. Rushworth, G. Shanger, and I. Vanderberg.

Geology

Mount Julian is composed of sedimentary rock laid down during the Precambrian to Jurassic periods. Formed in shallow seas, this sedimentary rock was pushed east and over the top of younger rock during the Laramide orogeny.

Climate

Based on the Köppen climate classification, Mount Julian is located in a subarctic climate zone with cold, snowy winters, and mild summers. Winter temperatures can drop below −20 °C with wind chill factors below −30 °C.

See also
 
 Geography of Alberta

Gallery

References

External links
 Mount Julian: Mountain-forecast.com

Two-thousanders of Alberta
Mountains of Jasper National Park